Streptomyces roseofulvus is a bacterium species from the genus of Streptomyces which has been isolated from soil. Streptomyces roseofulvus produces deoxyfrenolicin and frenolicin B.

Further reading

See also 
 List of Streptomyces species

References

External links
Type strain of Streptomyces roseofulvus at BacDive -  the Bacterial Diversity Metadatabase	

roseofulvus
Bacteria described in 1958